Costeni may refer to several villages in Romania:

 Costeni, a village in the town of Tismana, Gorj County
 Costeni, a village in Cupșeni Commune, Maramureș County
 Costeni, a village in Măneciu Commune, Prahova County